Xenia Vasilievna Denikina (Chizh, Чиж; 2 April [O.S. 21 March] 1892 – 3 March 1973) was a Russian writer. From 1918 until his death in 1947, she was married to Anton Denikin.

Early life 
Xenia Chizh (sometimes transcribed Tchije) was born in Biała Podlaska, then part of Congress Poland in the Russian Empire. Her father was Vassili Ivanovitch Chizn, an artillery officer and local official, and her mother was Elisaveta Alexandrovna Toumskaya. She graduated from the Institute for Young Ladies in Warsaw, and was training to be a teacher when she started a relationship with Anton Denikin.

Career 
Denikina and her family went into exile in 1920, living eventually in France and Belgium, where she helped her husband write his memoirs. The couple took refuge in Mimizan in World War II, and she was briefly arrested and imprisoned by the Germans. She acted as an interpreter between the German occupiers and the Russian, Polish, and Ukrainian exiles there. Denikina kept a hidden journal from 1940 to 1945, totalling 28 school notebooks by the end. The Denikins moved to New York City after the war. Her husband died in Ann Arbor, Michigan in  1947.

Denikina was chair of the Russian Institutes Alumnae Association when it was founded in 1954. She assisted Russian history scholars, organized her husband's papers, and hosted cultural events for the Russian émigré community in New York.

Personal life and legacy 
Xenia Chizh married a White Army general, Anton Denikin, in 1918. They had a daughter, Marina Denikina, born in 1919. Xenia Denikina became an American citizen in 1951, returned to France in 1971, and died at Louviers in 1973, aged 80 years. Her daughter translated Denikina's wartime journal into French and published it in 1976, as Mimizan-sur-Guerre, Le Journal de ma mère sous l'Occupation. It was called "a unique portrait of émigré fortunes at their lowest ebb". Her remains and those of her husband were reinterred at Donskoy Monastery in Moscow in 2005, just before Marina's death that year. Her papers, and her husband's, are in the Bakhmeteff Archive of Russian and East European Culture at Columbia University Libraries.

References 

1892 births
1973 deaths
Russian women writers
People from Biała Podlaska
Polish emigrants to France
French emigrants to the United States